Glenda Linscott (born 1958) is an Australian actress and director, born in Rhodesia of English descent, she is best known internationally for her performance in cult drama series Prisoner as tough bikie inmate and top dog Rita "The Beater" Connors and series Murder Call

Career
Glenda was born in Rhodesia, before briefly immigrating to England, and finally to Adelaide, Australia, as a child. A graduate of the National Institute of Dramatic Art (NIDA), Linscott's most notable role is Network Ten prison drama Prisoner, for which she first appeared towards the end of the seventh season in 1985, while the character became immensely popular during the final season in 1986, despite the show's decline in ratings at that time. Prior to appearing on the show, Linscott gained much research on women prisoners and approached the New South Wales Department of Correctional Services and organised to spend some time inside one of their maximum security prisons. She also did extensive research on bikie gangs, spending a lot of time with real-life bikie Ian Doig who played her boyfriend "Slasher" in the series.

She later returned to Britain when she appeared in a stage play version of Prisoner. Guest roles include A Country Practice, All Saints and McLeod's Daughters. She also had a recurring role in the Australian drama, Murder Call as Pathologist, Dr. Imogen Soames between 1997 and 2000.

In November 2011, it was announced Linscott had joined the cast of Neighbours for three months as Dr. Jessica Girdwood, a surgeon at the Erinsborough Hospital. She made her first on screen appearance that same month.

In 2015 she took up the position of Head of Acting at the Western Australian Academy of Performing Arts (WAAPA).

Personal life
Linscott met ABC Radio Australia producer Richard Buckham in 1985 and they married in early 1989.

Filmography

References

External links
 

1958 births
Australian film actresses
Australian soap opera actresses
Australian stage actresses
Living people
20th-century Australian actresses
21st-century Australian actresses
National Institute of Dramatic Art alumni